Henry Carrington Lancaster (November 10, 1882 - January 29, 1954) was a prominent American scholar—the world's foremost expert on French dramatic literature in the 16th through 18th centuries.

Lancaster is noted for his unprecedented achievement of being awarded the Légion d'Honneur, given by France to the one person each year who has made the most exceptional contribution to its country (similar to, in the U.S., the American Medal of Freedom). This was unprecedented because it had never been given to a non-citizen. Being so well respected and appreciated by France, some years later, they bestowed another unprecedented honor in choosing him to be an officer ("Chevalier") of the Légion d'Honneur.  For most of Lancaster's academic life, he was chair of the Romance Languages Department and professor of French literature at Johns Hopkins University. "A meticulous scholar and a mine of factual information," he authored over ten books on French dramatic literature. Johns Hopkins Magazine, June 2008 issue, chose two professors who epitomized the most excellent, distinguished and well-loved, throughout the history of Johns Hopkins: one in recent times, and one past. Lancaster was selected for a feature article and full-page photograph. Carrington Lancaster's papers are held at Johns Hopkins.

Life
Lancaster was born in Richmond, Virginia, one of 13 siblings. He graduated with a B.A. within three years from the University of Virginia, then taught for a year at a southern private boys' school, before earning his PhD at Johns Hopkins University in 1907. He chose Amherst College for his first academic research and teaching appointment.  One of his closest professor friends there introduced Carrington—a tall handsome bachelor—to his younger sister, Helen Converse Clark—beautiful smart and poetic. Lancaster fell in love lifelong, as she with him. She was a student at Barnard College at the time, and daughter of the eminent U.S. economist Johns Bates Clark of Columbia University (advisor to three presidents, honored namesake of the nation's annual John Bates Clark Award in Economics). He married Helen Clark in 1913, and they made their first home in Amherst, where they were neighbors and close friends of Robert Frost. Their first two children, John Huntington Lancaster, and Helen Clark Lancaster were born in Amherst (Robert Frost awaiting Helen's birth with Lancaster on his back porch).

After moving to Baltimore In 1919—to succeed Edward C. Armstrong as professor at Johns Hopkins --, Maria Dabney Lancaster and Henry C. Lancaster, Jr. were born.    The family spent his sabbaticals in France. So beloved and respected was Carrington by his students, academic peers and friends, that they presented him with Adventures of a literary historian; a collection of his writings presented to H. Carrington Lancaster by his former students and other friends in anticipation of his sixtieth birthday, November 10, 1942. A very respected Baltimorean, Lancaster also wrote and spoke about Democratic causes. Originally Episcopalian, he became a Presbyterian church-goer with his family.  They loved summer weeks at Rockywold-Deephaven Camps in Holderness, NH. Lancaster also enjoyed swimming, walking/hiking in nature, entertaining colleagues and friends, writing clever poems and limericks, and taking care of the family dog, Blarney.

Works
 The French tragi-comedy; its origin and development from 1552 to 1628, 1907.
 Pierre Du Ryer, dramatist, 1912.
 A history of French dramatic literature in the seventeenth century, 1929.
 (ed.) Five French farces, 1655-1694, 1937.
 The Comédie française, 1680-1701; plays, actors, spectators, finances, 1941.
 Adventures of a literary historian; a collection of his writings presented to H. Carrington Lancaster by his former students and other friends in anticipation of his sixtieth birthday, November 10, 1942, 1942.
 Sunset, a history of Parisian drama in the last years of Louis XIV, 1701-1715, 1945.
 French tragedy in the time of Louis XV and Voltaire, 1715-1774, 1950.
 The Comédie française, 1701-1774: plays, actors, spectators, finances, 1951.
 French tragedy in the reign of Louis XVI and the early years of the French Revolution, 1774-1792, 1953.

References

1882 births
1954 deaths
Johns Hopkins University faculty
Historians of French literature
American literary critics
Presidents of the Modern Language Association